Makiyamaia sibogae is a species of sea snail, a marine gastropod mollusk in the family Clavatulidae.

Description

Distribution
This species occurs in the Pacific Ocean off Indonesia at depths of more than 800 m.

References

 Schepman, M. 1913. p. 425 [ Six specimens out of ten from Schepman 1913 were identified as M. sibogae by Shuto 1970. The locality and keywords correspond therefore to the established by Schepman 1913 for Surcula variabilis (synonym of Shutonia variabilis ]
 Shuto, T., 1970. Taxonomical note on the Turrids of the Siboga-Collection originally described by M.M. Schepman, 1913 (Part 2) . Jap. Jour. Malac., 29(2): 37–54.
 Tucker JK. Catalog of Recent and fossil turrids (Mollusca, Gastropoda) Zootaxa. 2004;682:1–1295

External links

sibogae
Gastropods described in 1970